opened in Tsu, Mie Prefecture, Japan, in 1982. The collection has a particular emphasis on yōga.

See also
 Mie Prefectural Museum
 List of Cultural Properties of Japan - paintings (Mie)

References

External links
  Mie Prefectural Art Museum
  Mie Prefectural Art Museum
 Mie Prefectural Art Museum at Google Cultural Institute

Museums in Mie Prefecture
Prefectural museums
Art museums and galleries in Japan
Art museums established in 1982
1982 establishments in Japan
Tsu, Mie